

Legislative Assembly elections

Chhattisgarh

Source:

Delhi

Source:

Himachal Pradesh

Source:

Madhya Pradesh

Meghalaya

Mizoram

Nagaland

Rajasthan 

Source:

Tripura

Source:

Rajya Sabha

References

External links

 Election Commission of India

2003 elections in India
India
2003 in India
Elections in India by year